Sarah Fraser, also called Mother Fraser (died 1880) was an Australian brothel keeper. 

She was the daughter of a British convict. She established a brothel in the Little Lon red light district in Melbourne in the mid 19th-century. Her brothel was the perhaps most expensive and famed brothel in Australia prior to the of Madame Brussels, and she was referred to as the Queen of Brothels. 

In 1867, when Queen Victoria’s son Alfred, Duke of Saxe-Coburg and Gotha visited Australia, police official Frederick Standish showed the prince to the brothel of Fraser, where he bought sex from Sarah Sarqui. This attracted great attention, and according to urban myth Fraser claimed her brothel had royal protection and had the royal banner raised above it.

References

 Barbara Minchinton, The Women of Little Lon: Sex Workers in Nineteenth Century Melbourne
 James Morton, Susanna Lobez, Gangland Melbourne
 MARGARET ARNOT,  PROSTITUTION AND THE STATE IN VICTORIA, 1890-1914

1880 deaths
Australian brothel owners and madams
People from Melbourne
19th-century Australian businesspeople
19th-century Australian women